The 2019 North Central Cardinals football team was an American football team that represented North Central College in the College Conference of Illinois and Wisconsin (CCIW) during the 2019 NCAA Division III football season. In their fifth year under head coach Jeff Thorne, the team compiled a 14–1 record (8–1 against conference opponents) and finished second out of ten teams in the CCIW. The team advanced to the NCAA Division III playoffs and defeated , 41–14, in the 2019 Stagg Bowl.

The team played its home games at Benedetti–Wehrli Stadium in Naperville, Illinois.

Schedule

Personnel

Players

1		Julian Bell	DB	5-7	146	So.	Oswego, Ill. / Oswego	Waubonsee CC
1		Khori Blair	WR	6-1	179	Jr.	Oak Park, Ill. / Oak Park-River Forest
2		Zach Greenberg	DB	6-1	196	Sr.	Naperville, Ill. / Neuqua Valley
3		Zach Butler	DB	5-9	196	Jr.	Kingston, Ill. / Genoa-Kingston	
3		Tommy Coates	WR	6-3	183	Fr.	Chicago, Ill. / De La Salle	
3		Daniel Slaughter	LB	5-9	212	Fr.	Palm Harbor, Fla. / East Lake	
4		Dakota Cremeens	DB	5-8	180	Jr.	Bloomington, Ill. / Normal Community	
4		Matt Metz	WR	6-1	184	Jr.	Morton Grove, Ill. / Niles West	
5		De'Angelo Roberson	DB	5-10	174	Jr.	Mount Prospect, Ill. / Wisconsin-Eau Claire
6		Michael Baumgardner	LB	5-7	191	So.	Naperville, Ill. / Neuqua Valley
6		DeAngelo Hardy	WR	6-1	190	Fr.	Lake Villa, Ill. / Lakes
7		Bryan Beauchamp	LB	6-0	221	Sr.	Fairland, Ind. / Triton Central
7		Arek Kleniuk	QB	6-0	164	Fr.	Mount Prospect, Ill. / Rolling Meadows
8		Ethan Greenfield	RB	5-9	195	So.	Lindenhurst, Ill. / Lakes
8		Sean Jacobs	LB	5-8	200	Fr.	Buffalo Grove, Ill. / Buffalo Grove	
9		Tommy Hyland	DL	6-4	261	Jr.	Lombard, Ill. / Montini Catholic	Northwest Missouri State
9		Broc Rutter	QB	6-2	204	Sr.	Naperville, Ill. / Neuqua Valley	Indiana State
10		Talha Ayhan	DL	5-10	222	Jr.	Wheaton, Ill. / Glenbard South
11		Andrew Kamienski	WR	6-0	181	Jr.	Pingree Grove, Ill. / South Elgin
11		Tim Mayerhofer	DB	6-0	183	Jr.	Romeoville, Ill. / Plainfield East
12		Jake Johnson	QB	6-1	187	Fr.	Lake Villa, Ill. / Lakes
13		Cole Griffin	DB	5-11	205	So.	Tinley Park, Ill. / Andrew
13		Kevin Polaski	QB	5-11	148	Fr.	Elk Grove Village, Ill. / Conant
14		Sam Taviani	DB	6-0	181	So.	Downers Grove, Ill. / Downers Grove North
15		Jodeci Chappa	WR	6-0	156	Fr.	Immokalee, Fla. / Immokalee
16		Alec Wolff	DB	6-3	190	So.	Lombard, Ill. / Glenbard East
17		Eddie Villalobos	RB	5-5	150	Fr.	Rochelle, Ill. / Rochelle Twp.
17		Zach Witken	DB	5-9	199	Sr.	Riverside, Ill. / Riverside-Brookfield
18		Blake Williams	WR	6-4	186	Jr.	Aurora, Ill. / Metea Valley
19		Rob Simental	QB	6-1	191	Fr.	Chicago, Ill. / De La Salle
20		Ronin Gilbert	RB	5-9	178	Fr.	Tinley Park, Ill. / Tinley Park
20		Jared Hornbeck	WR	6-0	181	So.	Hampshire, Ill. / Hampshire	Robert Morris
21		Jake Beesley	DB	6-4	196	Jr.	Champaign, Ill. / Champaign Central	
22		Zach Garrett	RB	5-8	196	Sr.	Batavia, Ill. / Batavia	
22		Daniel Morales	DB	5-9	153	Fr.	Whiting, Ind. / Mount Carmel
23		Darius Cook	DB	5-8	177	Sr.	Chicago, Ill. / Lindblom Academy
23		Conner Rush	DB	5-10	150	Fr.	Pekin, Ill. / Pekin	
24		Armando Varela	RB	5-7	169	Sr.	San Ysidro, Calif. / San Ysidro	Southwestern 
25		Braden Lindmark	DB	6-3	188	So.	Naperville, Ill. / Naperville Central	
26		Rafael Rios	RB	5-9	180	Fr.	Highland, Ind. / Highland	
27		Javon Lee	DB	5-9	146	Fr.	Glenwood, Ill. / Homewood-Flossmoor	
28		Austin Ioerger	RB	5-8	191	Fr.	Metamora, Ill. / Metamora
28		Zach Weiss	DB	5-11	164	Fr.	Bolingbrook, Ill. / Neuqua Valley
29		Trevor Tesmond	DB	5-11	179	So.	Naperville, Ill. / Neuqua Valley
30		Payton Voitik	DB	6-2	189	Fr.	Morris, Ill. / Morris	Valparaiso 
31		Garrett Fiduccia	DB	6-0	185	So.	Aurora, Ill. / Oswego East
31		Logan Graham	LB	5-11	201	Fr.	Dwight, Ill. / Dwight Twp.
32		John Daway	LB	5-11	201	Fr.	Tampa, Fla. / Blake
33		Ben Wong	LB	6-0	215	Jr.	Bloomington, Ill. / Normal Community
34		Joey Carrell	DB	5-9	166	Fr.	Schaumburg, Ill. / Conant
34		Drew Vasquez	DB	5-7	173	Sr.	Effingham, Ill. / Effingham
35		Jamauri Spivery	LB	6-0	218	Jr.	Chicago, Ill. / Perspectives Charter	Trinity International Univ.
37		Eric Letterer	LB	5-10	186	Jr.	Dekalb, Ill. / Dekalb	
38		Adam Maluchnik	LB	5-10	208	Jr.	Dyer, Ind. / Andrean
39		Dan Gilroy	DL	6-3	230	So.	Cary, Ill. / Cary-Grove
40		Braden Hasty	LB	5-11	186	So.	Effingham, Ill. / Effingham	
40		Jake See	LB	5-9	206	Fr.	Hampshire, Ill. / Hampshire	
41		Levi Doan	RB	6-0	161	Fr.	Edinburg, Ill. / Edinburg	
41		Magnus Meyer	K/P	6-0	187	Fr.	Nesbru, Norway 
42		Terrence Hill	RB	5-10	173	So.	Effingham, Ill. / Effingham	
43		Mo Abuzir	LB	5-9	193	Fr.	Oak Forest, Ill. / Sandburg	
43		Jordan Kraft	LB	6-1	209	So.	Hobart, Ind. / Hobart	
44		Spenser Eversole	DL	6-2	219	Jr.	Pesotum, Ill. / Villa Grove	Eastern Illinois Univ.
45		Storm Simmons	LB	6-1	226	Jr.	Bloomington, Ill. / Normal Community
46		Thomas Mitchell	K/P	5-8	172	Fr.	Wilmington, Ohio / Kings
46		Jared Roberts	RB	6-1	236	Fr.	Winnebago, Ill. / Winnebago
47		Miguel Delvalle	LB	5-11	234	Fr.	Kirkland, Ill. / Hiawatha
47		Adam Green	LB	5-11	199	Fr.	Oswego, Ill. / Oswego East
48		Gavin Bauknecht	LB	5-9	217	Fr.	Pontiac, Ill. / Pontiac Township
48		Cameron Martin	DL	6-3	259	Jr.	Naperville, Ill. / Naperville North
49		Adam Haushahn	LB	6-2	219	So.	Glen Ellyn, Ill. / Glenbard South
49		Will Kettelkamp	DB	6-3	198	Fr.	Taylorville, Ill. / Taylorville
50		Griffin Paige	LB	6-0	211	Jr.	Effingham, Ill. / Effingham	McKendree Univ.
52		Sean Gorman	LB	5-11	206	So.	Palatine, Ill. / Fremd
53		Nathan Gray	OL	5-10	260	Jr.	Naperville, Ill. / Naperville North
54		Jack Cooper	DL	6-0	276	So.	Oswego, Ill. / Oswego East
55		Sharmore Clarke	OL	6-0	260	Jr.	Oak Park, Ill. / Oak Park-River Forest
56		George Western	DL	5-9	221	Fr.	Steger, Ill. / St. Rita
57		Chance Roberts	LB	6-0	197	Fr.	Liberty, Miss. / Amite
57		Jordan Ryan	OL	6-0	260	Jr.	Streamwood, Ill. / Streamwood
58		Owen Henriques	DL	6-0	200	Sr.	Cary, Ill. / Cary-Grove	
59		Colton Bauknecht	OL	6-2	270	Sr.	Pontiac, Ill. / Pontiac Township
60		Vaughn Valone	OL	6-2	265	So.	Monee, Ill. / Peotone
61		Bobby Gannon	OL	5-11	295	Sr.	Downers Grove, Ill. / Montini Catholic
61		Cody Hardt	OL	5-11	231	Fr.	Hudson, Ill. / Normal West
62		Michael Hasenstab	OL	6-4	269	So.	Champaign, Ill. / Champaign Central
63		Brandon Greifelt	DL	6-1	268	So.	Mount Prospect, Ill. / Notre Dame Prep
64		Derek Bex	OL	5-11	287	Fr.	Batavia, Ill. / Batavia
64		Derek Murphy	OL	6-4	273	So.	Sandwich, Ill. / Sandwich
65		Will Jandak	OL	6-2	289	Fr.	Rochelle, Ill. / Rochelle Twp.
65		Ethan Kiley	DL	6-1	236	Jr.	Lake Villa, Ill. / Lakes
67		Zach Fortier	OL	6-6	255	Fr.	Oak Forest, Ill. / Sandburg
68		Isiah Ziegler	DL	5-10	314	So.	Carpentersville, Ill. / Dundee-Crown
69		Daniel Dusik	OL	6-3	231	Fr.	McHenry, Ill. / Marian Central Catholic
71		Jake Fiedler	OL	6-3	271	Sr.	Yorkville, Ill. / Yorkville
72		Will Ebert	OL	6-2	272	So.	Arlington Heights, Ill. / Hersey
74		Ryan Ohlsen	DL	5-11	280	So.	Evansville, Ind. / Reitz
74		Jarod Thornton	OL	5-11	295	Fr.	Homewood, Ill. / Homewood-Flossmoor
75		Jack Grupka	OL	6-1	264	Fr.	Lake Villa, Ill. / Lakes
75		Ricky Strba	OL	6-4	286	Sr.	Buffalo Grove, Ill. / Buffalo Grove
77		James Hart	OL	6-2	334	Fr.	Rochelle, Ill. / Rochelle Twp.	
80		Rick Maziarka	WR	5-11	159	Fr.	Orland Park, Ill. / Sandburg	
80		Axel Ponten	WR	5-11	180	Jr.	Uppsala, Sweden / International	Univ. of Wyoming
81		Jake Robinson	WR	6-1	169	Fr.	Peoria, Ariz. / Liberty	
82		Jonathon Joyce	WR	5-10	151	Fr.	Arcadia, Fla. / Evangelical Christian Academy	
82		Austin Zavis	WR	6-4	194	Sr.	Frankfort, Ill. / Lincoln-Way East
83		Tyler Egan	TE	6-4	235	Sr.	Chicago, Ill. / Mt. Carmel
84		Alex Rose	TE	6-3	235	Sr.	Schiller Park, Ill. / East Leyden
85		Jarrett Crider	WR	5-9	154	Fr.	Morton, Ill. / Morton
85		Hunter Greve	TE	6-2	211	So.	Morris, Ill. / Seneca	
85		Bryce Santarelli	WR	6-2	190	Fr.	Cape Coral, Fla. / Southwest Florida Christian Academy
86		Dana Anderson	TE	6-0	223	Jr.	Geneva, Ill. / Batavia
87		Joe Mohr	TE	5-11	207	Fr.	Carlock, Ill. / Normal West
88		Nic Rummell	WR	6-0	157	Fr.	Gilberts, Ill. / Hampshire	Iowa State Univ.
88		Tomas Savickas	TE	6-3	209	Fr.	Minooka, Ill. / Minooka
89		Sam Russchenberg	TE	6-2	208	Fr.	Palatine, Ill. / Palatine
90		Steven Niemann	OL	5-11	292	Fr.	Highland, Ind. / Highland
92		Zach Hartman	DL	6-2	213	Fr.	Utica, Ill. / La Salle-Peru
97		Alex Debolt	DL	6-0	237	Sr.	Aurora, Ill. / West Aurora
98		Matt Quinn	DL	6-2	221	Fr.	Naperville, Ill. / Neuqua Valley
99		Tyler Rich	DL	6-4	236	So.	Pontiac, Ill. / Pontiac Township

Coaching staff
 Head coach - Jeff Thorne
 Assistant coaches
 Brad Spencer (assistant head coach, offensive coordinator, recruiting coordinator)
 Shane Dierking (defensive coordinator, defensive backs coach)
 Tim Janecek (defensive line coach, strength coordinator)
 Eric Stuedemann (offensive line coach)
 Liam Crotty (kicking coach)
 Mavolio Grier (defensive line coach)
 John Howell (defensive backs coach)
 Greg Jensik (tight ends coach)
 Matt Sinclair (linebackers coach)
 Dylan Warden (wide receivers coach)
 Dan Starkey (running backs coach)
 Don Sutherland (linebackers coach)

References

Jacksonville State
North Central Cardinals football seasons
NCAA Division III Football Champions
North Central Cardinals football